The Tischofer Cave is a cave in the Kaisertal valley in the Kaisergebirge mountains in Austria. It was a locally important gathering place and weapons cache during the Tyrolean Rebellion in the Napoleonic Wars. 
Bone tools of paleo-human inhabitants made of cave bear bones and skulls discovered here and dated to about 27,000 - 28,000 years ago may be viewed in the local history museum in the fortress at Kufstein. That dating makes the Tischofer Cave the oldest known uncontested site of human occupation in Tyrol.

Discoveries of more recent human skeletons and associated tools also indicate that the cave served as a copper smithy and foundry during the Bronze Age.

The Tischofer Cave may be reached on foot via the Kaiser Path (Kaiseraufstieg) in the Kaisertal valley, a pathway secured with cable railings. It is recorded in the Tyrolean Cave Register as number 1312/001.

References

External links 

  Article from Hofmann: Wege im Inntal with comprehensive description'' 
 Die Tischofer Höhle im Kaisertal bei Kufstein at www.tirol-infos.at. 
 Tischofer Höhle im Kaisertal at www.kaisergebirge-online.de. 

Caves of Austria
Kufstein
Kaiser Mountains
Landforms of Tyrol (state)
Tourist attractions in Tyrol (state)
Archaeological sites in Austria